The Great Fire of Toronto or Great Toronto Fire may refer to:
 Great Fire of Toronto (1849)
 Great Fire of Toronto (1904)